Thomas Moore (17 October 1890 – 14 May 1973) was an Irish sportsperson. He played hurling with the Faughs hurling club and was a member of the Dublin senior inter-county team. Tommy also served as Chairman of Faughs for a total of forty years (1929–69). He became a recipient of the Hall of Fame Award and the All-Ireland Senior Club Hurling Championship trophy is now called the Tommy Moore Cup.

Biography
Moore allowed his pub in Cathedral Street, Dublin to be a meeting place for the club when they had nowhere else to go. His pub was a GAA landmark and it soon became an annual tradition for the All-Ireland winning team to bring the Liam MacCarthy Cup to the pub after the final had been played.

Playing career

Club
Moore won six Dublin Senior Hurling Championship medals with Faughs including a four in a row (1920–23).

Inter-county
At inter-county level, he won four Leinster Senior Hurling Championship medals with Dublin in 1917, 1919, 1920 and 1921. He also won two All-Ireland medals with Dublin in 1917 and 1920. In 1917, Dublin were represented by the Collegians (UCD) club and in 1920, by his own club, Faughs.

He captured his first Leinster title in 1917 following a 5–1 to 4–0 victory over Kilkenny. The subsequent All-Ireland final pitted 'the Dubs' against Tipperary. Dublin had come from nowhere and took on one of the giants of the championship. A 5–4 to 4–2 victory gave Dublin the victory and gave Moore his first All-Ireland medal.

Dublin surrendered their provincial crown in 1918, however, Kilkenny fell to 'the Dubs' again in 1919 giving Moore his second Leinster medal. Cork provided the opposition on that occasion, however, the Munster champions emerged victorious by 6–4 to 2–4.

Dublin retained their provincial title in 1920, giving Moore his third Leinster medal. The All-Ireland final was a replay of the previous year's encounter as Cork provided the opposition once again. Cork looked to be heading for victory, however, a four-goal blitz by Dublin sealed the 4–9 to 4–3 victory and gave Moore a second All-Ireland medal.

1921 saw Moore add a fourth Leinster memento to his collection before lining out in yet another All-Ireland final. Limerick were the opponents on that occasion, however, the game was not a memorable one for Moore. The score line of 8–5 to 3–2 resulted in a comprehensive victory for Limerick.

Dublin surrendered their provincial crown the following year. However, 1923 was a special year for Moore as he captained the Dublin team that were beaten in the Leinster final by Kilkenny, 4–1 to 1–1.

References

External links
 Faughs GAA Club
 Official Dublin GAA Website

 

1890 births
1973 deaths
Faughs hurlers
Dublin inter-county hurlers